Karlo Žganec (born 25 July 1995) is a Croatian professional basketball player, currently playing for Zadar in the Croatian League and ABA League.

Playing career 
On 26 July 2022, Žganec signed a contract with Zadar of the Croatian League for the 2022–23 season.

References

External links
 Profile at abaliga.com
 Profile at eurobasket.com 
 Profile at FIBA

1995 births
Living people
ABA League players
Basketball players from Zagreb
Centers (basketball)
Croatian men's basketball players
CS Universitatea Cluj-Napoca (men's basketball) players
Croatian expatriate basketball people in Romania
KK Cedevita players
KK Split players
KK Zagreb players
Power forwards (basketball)
KK Zadar players